DWID (98.3 FM), on-air as 98.3 Love Radio, is a radio station owned and operated by Manila Broadcasting Company. The station's studio and transmitter are located at the 3rd floor, Carried Realty Corporate Lumber Bldg., M.H. del Pilar St., Dagupan.

References

Radio stations in Dagupan
Radio stations established in 1988
Love Radio Network stations